The 1945 San Diego State Aztecs football team represented San Diego State College during the 1945 college football season.

San Diego State did not field a team in 1943 and 1944 due to World War II. For this shortened first post-war season, San Diego State was again a member of the California Collegiate Athletic Association (CCAA), but only two CCAA schools fielded a team so there was no champion named. The team was led by head coach Bob Breitbard in his first and only season with the Aztecs. They played home games at Balboa Stadium in San Diego, California. The Aztecs finished the season with two wins and five losses (2–5, 1–0 CCAA). Overall, the team was outscored by its opponents 65–163 for the season.

Schedule

Team players in the NFL
No San Diego State players were selected in the 1946 NFL Draft.

Notes

References

San Diego State
San Diego State Aztecs football seasons
San Diego State Aztecs football